Platinum Football Club is a Saint Lucia football club based in Vieux Fort. The club plays in the Saint Lucia Gold Division.

Squad

References 

Football clubs in Saint Lucia